Ernő Szenes (born Ernő Schwarcz; 24 December 1889 – 25 February 1945) was a Hungarian actor. He was active in theatre and film between 1915 and 1939. He died in the Buchenwald concentration camp in February 1945, only three months before the end of the Second World War.

Selected filmography
Lotti ezredesi (1916)
Ki a győztes? (1919)
A kormánybiztos (1919)
A csodagyerek (1920)
A napkelet asszonya (1927)
Autobus Nr. 2 (1929)
Der Ruf des Nordens (1929)
Die singende Stadt (1930)
Es gibt eine Frau, die dich niemals vergißt (1930)
Liebe und Champagner (1930)
Grock (1931)
Hyppolit, a lakáj (1931)
Rákóczi induló (1933)
Mindent a nöért! (1934)
Rotschild leánya (1934)
3:1 a szerelem javára (1937)
Egy lány elindul (1937)
Fekete gyémántok (1938)
Papucshős (1938)

References

External links

1889 births
1945 deaths
People from Miskolc
Hungarian male stage actors
Hungarian male silent film actors
Hungarian male film actors
20th-century Hungarian male actors
Expatriate actors in Germany
Expatriate male actors in the United States
Hungarian expatriates in Germany
Hungarian expatriates in the United States
Hungarian cabaret performers
Hungarian comedians
Hungarian civilians killed in World War II
Hungarian people who died in Buchenwald concentration camp
Hungarian Jews who died in the Holocaust
Jewish cabaret performers